Medway was launched at Frindsbury in 1810. She made two voyages between 1820 and 1825 transporting convicts to Van Diemen's Land. Medway was ondemned at Calcutta in late 1840.

Career
Medway enters Lloyd's Register in 1810 with Peterson, master, Taylor & Co., owner, and trade London–Jamaica.

Convict voyage #1 (1820-1821): Captain Borthwick Wight sailed Medway from on 13 November 1820. She arrived at Hobart Town on 13 March 1821. She had embarked 156 convicts, none of whom died en route. The 53rd Regiment of Foot provided the guard. Medway sailed on to Sydney, arriving there on 27 March; she carried a number of prisoners being transferred from Hobart to Newcastle, New South Wales. Newcastle had become a place where the most dangerous convicts were sent to dig in the coal mines as punishment for their crimes.

Convict voyage #2 (1825): Captain Wight sailed Medway from Land's End on 22 August 1825 and arrived in Hobart on 9 December 1825. She had embarked 172 male convicts. One source states that she had no deaths en route; another source states that she had four. The 57th Regiment of Foot provided the guard.

Fate
Medway, Griffith, master, from Sydney, was condemned at Calcutta in 1840. Her hull was sold at auction for Rupees 4,500. Medway was last listed in Lloyd's Register in 1841.

Citations and references
Citations

References

1810 ships
Age of Sail merchant ships of England
Convict ships to Tasmania